Liatris chapmanii, also known as Chapman's blazing star or Chapman's gayfeather, is a plant species in the family Asteraceae and genus Liatris. It is native to Alabama, Florida and Georgia in the United States, where it is found in habitats  such as dunes, beach strands, sand ridges, fields and roadsides, it also grows in longleaf pine savannas and other scrub habitats.

The stems have short often ridged hairs. Plants have flowers in dense heads that are appressed against the stems, the heads have no stalks and are arranged in a dense spike-like collection. The basal and cauline leaves have one nerve and are spatulate-oblanceolate to narrowly oblanceolate in shape, they are also dotted with glands and hairless or have short stiff hairs. It flowers in August and October. The seed are produced in cypselae (a type of fruit) that are 4 to 6 millimeters long with feathery bristle-like pappi that have minute barbs.

References

chapmanii
Flora of Alabama
Flora of Florida
Flora of Georgia (U.S. state)